Christian Albert (Gottorp – , Gottorp) was a duke of Holstein-Gottorp and bishop of Lübeck.

Biography
Christian Albert was a son of Frederick III, Duke of Holstein-Gottorp, and his wife Princess Marie Elisabeth of Saxony. He became duke when his father died in the Castle Tönning, besieged by the King Christian V of Denmark. He was forced to flee at that point, and the remainder of his life was characterized by his fight with Denmark. Later, he was to marry the daughter of King Frederick III of Denmark, a marital alliance arranged in the hope for peace, but it changed nothing. 

During Christian Albert's reign, the connection with Sweden, initiated by his father, was strengthened, which provided some protection. However, this also led to the duchy being pulled into all of Sweden's conflicts, including the Great Northern War and several wars with Denmark. From 1675 to 1689, Christian Albert lived in exile in Hamburg. However, with the aid of the Holy Roman Emperor and the European allies, he managed to force the Danish king to sign the so-called Altonaer Vergleich, which allowed him to regain his former position.

Christian Albert made some contribution to culture, education and the arts. On 5 October 1665, he founded the University of Kiel. In 1678, he took part in the founding of the Hamburg Oper am Gänsemarkt. Both he and his father, Frederick III, extended patronage to the painter Jürgen Ovens, who worked for more than thirty years with them.

Family and children
Christian Albert married, on 24 October 1667, Princess Frederica Amalia of Denmark, daughter of King Frederick III of Denmark and Sophie Amalie of Brunswick-Lüneburg. They had the following children:
 Sophie Amalie (19 January 1670 – 27 February 1710), married on 7 July 1695 to Prince Augustus William, Duke of Brunswick-Wolfenbüttel.
 Duke Frederick IV of Holstein-Gottorp (18 October 1671 – 19 July 1702), patrilineal ancestor of all Russian emperors after Catherine II.
 Duke Christian August of Holstein-Gottorp (11 January 1673 – 24 April 1726), whose eldest-surviving son established a new dynasty in Sweden-Finland.
 Marie Elisabeth (21 March 1678 – 17 July 1755), Abbess of Quedlinburg.

Agnatic progeny of his elder son ended up on the throne of Russia, and agnatic progeny of the younger son – on the thrones of Sweden and Oldenburg.

See also
 History of Schleswig-Holstein

Ancestors

Lutheran Prince-Bishops of Lübeck
Dukes of Holstein-Gottorp
University of Kiel
1641 births
1695 deaths